WGTZ is a commercial FM station licensed in Eaton, Ohio at 92.9 MHz serving the Dayton and Springfield market area with an adult hits format, branded as "92-9 Jack FM." It is currently owned by Portland, Oregon-based Alpha Media.  Its studios are located in Kettering, Ohio (with a Dayton address) and its transmitter is in Brookville, Ohio.

History

MOR (1959-1972)
WGTZ was founded in 1959 by WCTM co-founder Stanley Coning and three other business partners (dba:Western Ohio Broadcasting Service Inc.) and took to the air in November 1960. WCTM-FM aired mostly beautiful music, but was essentially a middle of the road (MOR) format in the beginning. Its original FM tower still stands today on North Barron Street in downtown Eaton near the Norfolk Southern Railway crossing with the original call letters still intact.

In the 1960s, Coning was locked out of the station in an attempt by his partners to take over the operation, but were taken to court. Coning won and became the sole owner. He originally wanted an AM station first, but was unable to obtain a license at the time, so he went for the FM license. A serious heart attack in the early 1970s forced him to put the station up for sale while at the same time, Great Trails was looking to acquire an FM station as a sister for its Dayton AM station WING when no more commercial FM frequencies in Dayton were available. WCTM-FM was the logical choice. Coning sold the station and eventually was granted an AM frequency several years after his health improved. WCTM was on the air from 1981 until 2004, when he retired and sold the station due to failing health and age. That station is now WEDI simulcasting WBZI (AM) in Xenia with a classic country format.

Easy listening (1972-1979)
After the station was acquired, the calls were changed to WJAI (for "Jai-Alai" a popular game in Florida.) Great Trails purchase of the station did not include the existing studio. Stan Coning obliged by constructing a temporary studio in the basement of his home in Eaton; the quirky studio consisted of a rack along the left wall with aged broadcasting gear, an ancient Gates "Yard" audio board in front, a washer/dryer and toilet along the back wall. Access to the basement studio was through a windowed sliding door. WJAI-FM remained at this location for nearly three years. Coning was employed as the on-site engineer, Program Director John Robertson rarely visited the studios, maintaining his Dayton, Ohio address. Robertson was a former WING-Dayton on-air personality, promoted to managing the station and its low-maintenance format. Robertson hired Doug Ritter (Doug Ritterling) as one of WJAI's first announcers.  Ritter was only 16 years of age. Ritter later became a news anchor at WING-Dayton. Great Trails' purchase of WJAI was motivated by a possibility of a transmitter power increase, and access to the much larger Dayton market. The power increase was finally approved by the FCC after a prolonged legal battle with owners of two Dayton stations; the owners protested establishment of a new competing station in the Dayton market.

WJAI's first "official" studios were moved to a movie theater which had been converted to an office building at the corner of Somers and North Barron streets in downtown Eaton.

Country (1979-1982) 
The beautiful music continued under the new nickname "WJ-93" until 1979, when it switched to country music giving competition to WONE (AM) in Dayton and WBZI in Xenia (then at 95.3 FM). By this time, Kim Faris was on board doing mid-days as one of the first women DJs in the Dayton market area. She was joined by afternoon personality Ron Scott. Doug Davisson did the 7 to midnight shift after leaving WONE AM in the early 1980s. The studios would eventually move to its current location at 717 E. David Rd. in early 1986, where it would join clustermate 1410 WING AM.

Adult standards (1982-1984) 
In the early 1980s, the syndicated Al Ham's "Music Of Your Life", a big band/ballad-themed 1940s/early 50s format was gaining a following on stations in Indianapolis, Chicago and other market areas. WJAI did its own take on the format, though they themselves furnished the music instead. The format ran from 1982 to 1984.

The WJAI callsign is now used by an Air 1 repeater station owned by EMF Broadcasting at 93.9 MHz licensed to Pearl, Mississippi serving the Jackson, Mississippi area

Top 40 (1984-2007) 
 The Z-93 nickname has been used by many hit stations since the late 1970s in other radio market areas, so Great Trails gave the nickname a try while at the same time moving the Top 40 format over from WING to the newer FM. On March the 18th of 1984 at noon, Great Trails Broadcasting flipped WJAI to WGTZ, with the first song on the new "Hot Rockin' Flame Throwin' Z-93" was "Eat It!" by "Weird" Al Yankovic, kicking off 10,093 songs in a row without commercial interruption.

The catchy legal ID "WGTZ Eaton, Dayton And Springfield alive!" first caught the attention of listeners that same year when there was no CHR station in Dayton at the time. The phrase was coined by Z-93 creator/PD/Mornings John King as an attempt to position Z-93 as a Dayton station and not as an Eaton station.  This was when the transmitter was located in the city of Eaton, Ohio before the transmitter would be relocated to Brookville, Ohio the following year. Earlier in the decade, WING switched to adult contemporary mixed with oldies and the former WDJX in Xenia (transplanted to Beavercreek as WYMJ "Majic 104", later "Oldies 104") followed suit. Former AOR WVUD, then owned by The University of Dayton, tried its hand at the CHR/Pop format for a brief time however the station was later sold and became AC WLQT "Lite 100", and later, "Lite 99.9" under its new owners, and even WTUE decided to go to war with WGTZ as well.

The station's branding initially consisted of the text "Z-93" in block letters with a drop shadow. This logo was often displayed adjacent to the Coca-Cola company's "Enjoy Coke" logo in a co-branding campaign. In late 1984 and early 1985, bumper stickers bearing this logo pairing were widely distributed as part of a contest whereby people were eligible to win a 1985 Chevy IROC-Z if they sent in a registration form and displayed the Z-93 bumper sticker on their car. In 1990, the station switched to a different logo with the "Z-93" underlined and written in a graffiti-like, scrawled style, with red lettering underlined with black lettering over a yellow background making up the Z-93 portion of the logo, and the WGTZ 92.9 FM call sign and frequency displayed in a red line underneath the Z-93 logo in yellow letters. At this time, Z-93 also sold T-shirts and other merchandise featuring the new logo at Dayton/Springfield area JCPenney stores for a period of a year or so.

Great Trails also owned Z-93's then sister stations WCOL and WXGT in Columbus. WCOL 1230 AM  was Columbus' heritage Top-40 station through the 1960s and 1970s, and also appears in a scene in the Tom Hanks movie "That Thing You Do", released in 1996.  WCOL-FM 92.3 played album-oriented rock music.  Largely because of the demise of AM radio, Great Trails abandoned Top-40 music on its AM station and moved it to its FM signal.  WCOL-FM changed its call letters to WXGT and became more commonly known as 92X, Columbus' first and most popular contemporary hit radio station. It was largely due to the success of 92X that Great Trails made the decision to bring the format to Dayton.  WXGT and WGTZ were virtual clones of each other, using similar playlists, imaging, personalities, jingles and even station logos.

WGTZ's studios are located at 717 E. David Road in Kettering, the same location as its AM sister WING with its transmitter moved in 1985 to Brookville between Eaton and Englewood, where it broadcasts at 40,000 watts. It currently shares its studio location with Urban Contemporary WDHT, Urban AC WROU-FM, and Modern AC WCLI-FM.

On May 17, 2007, Philadelphia-based Main Line Broadcasting announced the acquisition of Radio One's stations in the Dayton and Louisville market areas. Main Line took over the Dayton stations on September 14, 2007.

Throughout the 2000s, WGTZ repeatedly jabbed at what was then known as WDKF for not having local DJs or contests with local winners and being controlled by Clear Channel’s corporate operations. WDKF responded with similar messaging on its own station.

Z-93 morning shows
John King and Terry Dorsey (who originally broadcast afternoons at WING) came to Z-93 in 1984 as the first "Morning Crew" for a year.  King was also PD of Z-93 during this time. They were followed by "Dr. Dave" Gross and "Wild Bill" taking the reins from March 1985 until September 4, 1987, when it became known as simply "The Z Morning Zoo".  During their first ratings sweep, "Dr. Dave" and "Wild Bill" doubled the morning show's Arbitron ratings, and within one year became the first morning show in Dayton radio to unseat the #1 ranked WHIO morning show (hosted by the legendary Lou Emm for over 40 consecutive years).  Alan Kaye replaced Wild Bill as Dr. Dave's side-kick on September 7, 1987.  Dr. Dave would leave in March 1990, replaced briefly by Humble Billy Hayes.

In June 1990, night jock Joe Mama replaced Hayes.  Todd Hollst, who was doing overnights, began producing comedy bits & doing stunts for the show.  In March 1991, Alan Kaye would be fired under controversy by GM David Macejko, which would result in a later lawsuit from Kaye, which he would win.  Joe Mama's new co-host was Sandy Donovan.

In March 1992, Jeff Wicker was hired as the new Z-93 Morning Show host under PD Kevin Kenney, and Mama and Donovan were fired, and the "Z Morning Zoo" name was permanently retired.  Kim Faris, who had been doing news at the station since Marita Matray departed in 1990, was named Wicker's new co-host, along with Producer Dave.  Booger Johnson would later replace Dave in 1995 as Morning Show Producer.  Wicker left the station in August 1995, replaced briefly by "The Hawkman", and then he was permanently replaced by Jack Pohl, with the morning show being called simply "Jack and Kim in the Morning", with future Z-93 morning host Scott Mallory becoming Morning Show Producer.

After Pohl left to take the position of Sports Director at local TV station WDTN-TV 2 in 1997, he was replaced briefly by former 92X evening host Suzy Waud.  Upon her departure, Chadow briefly hosted mornings.  He would be replaced by comedians Rob Haney and Chili Challis, who along with Kim Faris and Producer Scott Mallory would be referred to as "The Z-93 Morning Show".  Mallory left Z-93 in Fall 1997 for Alternative WXEG, where he would host afternoons and mornings before returning to Z-93 as Morning host in 2003.  Haney left WGTZ in March, 1998, and was replaced by long-time afternoon drive host Sean Roberts.  Challis would leave in mid-1998.  Roberts left Z-93 in mid-June, 1999 after 7 1/2 years combined between hosting afternoons and mornings, making Sean one of Z-93's longest-tenured "Zeejays" in the history of Z-93.

After two months of Scott Sharp subbing, along with Angie J. and Kim and Morning Show Producer Mike D., Jim Wheeler was hired in August, 1999, and the show would now be known as "Jim and Kim in the Morning".  Campy moved over to Z-93 after sister station 102.9 WING-FM changed formats from Classic rock to CHR/Rhythmic as WDHT Hot 102.9 in August 2001 and became the third host, along with Jim and Kim, and the show became known as "Z-93 Mornings with Jim, Kim, and Campy".  Wheeler would appear sporadically from September 2001-March 2002, with Kim and Campy referring to Jim as being on "special assignment".  When Wheeler left in mid-March, 2002, the show going forward was known as "The Morning Z with Kim and Campy."

Faris was moved to middays in August, 2002, leaving Campy solo in the morning as a search for a new morning host was underway.  Scott Mallory was eventually hired and debuted on Monday, March 17, 2003, and the show would be known until the end of Z-93 (on November 1, 2007) as "The Morning Z with Mallory and Campy".  Kim Faris stayed on at the station doing mid-days until the end of 2006 when she was inducted into the Ohio Broadcasters Hall Of Fame. She announced her departure from the Z-93 air staff in December of that year and thanked her many fans who sent in countless letters and e-mails thanking her for a job well done. In 2007, Faris was also inducted into the Dayton Area Broadcasters Hall of Fame. She was joined by fellow broadcasters from WING's hit music era including Kathy O'Conner Bow, Charlie Reeder, Bill Nance and Reetha Phillips. Faris returned to the air in the summer of 2007 as the morning personality of competitor WLQT 94.5 Lite FM, where she remains on-air today as the morning host.

Adult hits (2007-2015)
On November 1, 2007, "Z-93" came to an end with "Good Riddance (Time of Your Life)" by Green Day, followed by an announcement that Z-93 would be changing formats the following day, and began stunting with a countdown. All "Z-93" jocks were either let go or reassigned within the Main Line/Dayton cluster.

According to the Dayton Daily News on November 2, 2007, Z-93 was expected to switch to a Variety Hits format as "92-9 Jack FM," this according to Radio Online.

At  12 Noon on Friday, November 2, 2007, "FLY 92-9" debuted with an Adult Hits format and the tag line "We Play Anything." The first three songs played were The Steve Miller Band's "Fly Like An Eagle", Sugar Ray's "Someday", and Bryan Adams' "Summer of '69".

Soft rock (2015-2017)

On February 27, 2015, at 3 p.m., WGTZ flipped to AC as "Soft Rock 92.9." The final song on "Fly" was "Time for Me to Fly" by REO Speedwagon, while the first song on "Soft Rock" was Starship's "Nothing's Gonna Stop Us Now". WGTZ incorporated elements of the previous format (including much of the playlist) into its presentation. However, the format failed to make any traction in the market, holding a mere 2.7 in the Spring 2017 Nielsen ratings, the last under the format.

Adult hits (2017-present)
On September 1, 2017, at 5 p.m., after again playing "Good Riddance (Time of Your Life)", WGTZ flipped back to adult hits as "92.9 Jack FM" (coincidentally, the name it was rumored to use 10 years prior with the initial flip), as part of several flips to the format by Alpha planned across the country. The first song on "Jack" was "Hey Ya!" by OutKast. Under the new format, WGTZ will compete against WRZX.

See also
WCTM
WING
WROU-FM
WDHT
List of radio stations in Ohio

References

External links
92.9 Jack FM 

GTZ
Radio stations established in 1960
Alpha Media radio stations
Adult hits radio stations in the United States
Jack FM stations